Philobota stella is a moth of the family Oecophoridae. It is found in Australia, including Tasmania.

References

Oecophoridae
Moths described in 1856